The Cello Sonata No. 1 in D minor, Op. 21, by Henrique Oswald was composed in 1898 in Florence. It is dedicated to Luigi Stefano Giarda. Approximate duration is 21 minutes.

History 
There are two autograph versions of the sonata. The first one is dated 1898 (same year as the composition of the Piano Quartet No. 2, Op. 26), the second is 1901. The first version was published in 1982 by Editora Novas Metas. There is also a manuscript arrangement for double bass dated 1901. It was included by Fausto Borém De Oliveira in his 1993 thesis. Same thesis proposed some errata for the 1982 edition.

Structure 
The sonata is in traditional three movements:

I. Allegro agitato (D minor)
II. Romanza. Adagio molto espressivo (B major)
III. Molto allegro (D minor)

Analysis 
The first movement is a sonata form, the first subject of which presents all the four main motives of the movement: two of them form the theme, while the other two are used for a contrapuntal accompaniment. At first the theme is given to cello, then it is played for another time by the piano. The second subject is in F major, and its theme is stated by the piano alone, passing later to the cello. It is based on the two motives of the first subject accompaniment. The exposition is repeated. The development section can be easily divided into smaller parts. After a brief introduction (bars 83–90) with only fragments of it appearing, the principal theme is carried through different keys and registers (91–114). It stops in A major. In the second part of the development (115–134) this motif is transformed into piano accompaniment for the cello working out the descending motif (found originally in the first subject accompaniment). The music chromatically modulates to A major. The third part (134–153) by a B pedal prepares the A leading to the tonic (D minor). The recapitulation states the principal theme again, and then comes the second subject in D major. The key is changed back to minor in the coda based on the descending motif.

The second movement is a romance in B major, in ternary form. The broad cantilena theme is sung twice by the cello with the piano providing an accompaniment. After a middle section with turbulent arpeggios in the piano part, this theme returns, as the instruments change the roles. For the coda the cello takes the leading position again.

The finale is the shortest movement of the entire composition lasting a few more than 4 minutes. It is again a D minor sonata form. The resolute first subject soon gives place to the F major second theme. The development mixes them. In the recapitulation the second subject appears in D major. This time the major mode is kept up to the end of the sonata.

Editions 
Henrique Oswald. Sonata op. 21 (violoncelo e piano). São Paulo: Editora Novas Metas, ©1982. 27 + 8 p. (edited by José Eduardo Martins).

Recordings 
Original version
 (1983) Henrique Oswald: Integral para violoncelo e piano; obras para piano solo – Antônio del Claro (cello), José Eduardo Martins (piano) – Funarte 3.56.502.001 (2 LPs)
 (2001) Henrique Oswald: Música de câmara para violoncelo e piano: Berceuse; Elegia; Sonata op. 21; Sonata-Fantasia op. 44 – duoCERVALI: Milene Aliverti (cello) and Lucia Cervini (piano) – Apoio FAPESP (CD, uncommercial)
Double bass version
 (2015) Metamorfora: Works for double bass and piano (Boccherini, Sallinen, Beethoven, Oswald [Cello Sonata, Op. 21, transposed to E minor], Proto) – Marcos Machado (double bass), Ney Fialkow (piano) – Blue Griffin BGR369 (CD)

References

Sources 
 Lucia Cervini. Interpretação em Henrique Oswald: transformações entre o allegro agitato da sonata op. 21 e a sonata-fantasia op. 44 para violoncelo e piano. 2001. 215 p. Dissertação (mestrado) - Universidade Estadual de Campinas, Instituto de Artes, Campinas, SP.

Further reading 
 Eduardo Monteiro. Henrique Oswald (1852-1931). Un compositeur brésilien au-delà du nationalisme musical. L’exemple de sa musique de chambre avec piano. Tese (Doutorado em Musicologia), Sorbonne, Paris, 2000.

External links 
 The 1982 published score of the sonata can be found in Appendix to Lucia Cervini's thesis
 A performance of the sonata by Marta Carmo do Espirito Santo (cello) and Bettina Chaussabel (piano), at the Kammermusiksaal – Folkwang Universität der Künste in Essen, Germany, on October 19, 2010 (YouTube) : I, II, III

Compositions by Henrique Oswald
Oswald, Henrique
Compositions in D minor
1898 compositions